The English Challenge is a golf tournament on the Challenge Tour, played in England.

History
The event was held for the first time in 1993 as the Collingtree Park Challenge and was played as the Stockley Park Challenge in 1994. There was a nine-year break before it made a one-off return in 2004 as the Donnington Grove Computacenter English Challenge Open.

The English Challenge returned to the schedule again in 2010 at Stoke by Nayland Hotel, Golf & Spa in Stoke-by-Nayland, Suffolk. Australia's Daniel Gaunt won the tournament by one stroke from English amateur Tommy Fleetwood and Scotland's Craig Lee. The event was played Stoke by Nayland again in 2011 and 2012.

The event returned again in 2016 at the Heythrop Park Resort in Enstone as the Bridgestone Challenge. In 2017, it moved to Luton Hoo and used modified Stableford scoring system. The 2018 event was again at Luton Hoo but returned to the 72-hole stroke play format.

Winners

References

External links
Coverage on the Challenge Tour's official site

Challenge Tour events
Golf tournaments in England
Sport in Essex
1993 establishments in England